An umbrella is a canopy device designed to protect from precipitation or sunlight.

Umbrella or Umbrellas may also refer to:

Arts, entertainment, and media

Films
The Umbrellas of Cherbourg, a 1964 film by Jaques Demy
Umbrella (film), a 2007 documentary film directed by Du Haibin
The Umbrella (film), a 1933 British comedy film directed by Redd Davis

Literature
Umbrella (children's book), a 1958 Caldecott Honor picture book by Taro Yashima
Umbrella (novel), a 2012 novel by Will Self
Umbrella: A Pacific Tale, by Ferdinand Mount

Music

Groups
Umbrellas (band), an indie rock band
The Umbrellas (jazz ensemble), an Australian jazz ensemble

Albums
Umbrellas (band), self-titled album by the Umbrellas
Umbrella (The Innocence Mission album), 1991
Umbrella (Shota Shimizu album), 2008

Songs
"Umbrella" (song), a 2007 song by Rihanna featuring Jay-Z
"Umbrella" (Metro Boomin, 21 Savage and Young Nudy song), 2022
"Umbrella", a song by Dog's Eye View from the 1997 album Daisy
"Umbrella", a song by Nits, 1979
"Umbrella", a song by Siouxsie and the Banshees released as the second single for the 1986 album Tinderbox
"Umbrella", a song from Steve Angello and Sebastian Ingrosso, 2007
"Umbrella", a song by The Baseballs, 2009
"Umbrella", a song by The Boppers, 1981
"Umbrella", a song by Utopia, 1980
"Umbrella", a song by Yui from the 2007 album Can't Buy My Love
"The Umbrella Man", recorded by many artists including Flanagan and Allen

Other arts, entertainment, and media
The Umbrella, a Canadian arts talk show television series
Umbrella (newsletter), an American newsletter on artist's books
Umbrella Corporation, the fictional corporation in the Resident Evil series
Umbrella Entertainment, a company in Australia whose DVDs were distributed by Madman Entertainment
The Umbrellas (Renoir), 1880s

Technology
Umbrella (underwater nuclear test), conducted as part of Operation Hardtack I
Cisco Umbrella, OpenDNS rebranded as a business service

Other uses 
Umbrella (company), an American video game developer
Umbrella brand, an overarching brand
Umbrella company, a trading vehicle for UK freelancers/contractors
Umbrella fund, an investment term
Umbrella insurance, liability insurance that is in excess of specified other policies and potentially primary insurance for losses not covered by the other policies
, an island in Georgian Bay, Ontario
Umbrella Movement, the Hong Kong political movement involved in the 2014 Hong Kong protests
Umbrella organization, an association of institutions
Umbrella school, an alternative education school
Umbrella term, a word that provides a superset or grouping of concepts that all fall under a single common category

See also
The Umbrellas (disambiguation)